Rathmann is a surname. Notable people with the surname include:

Dick Rathmann (1924–2000), American racecar driver
George Rathmann (1927–2012), American chemist, biologist, pioneer in biotechnology and corporate executive
Jim Rathmann (1928–2011), born Royal Richard Rathmann, American racecar driver who won the Indianapolis 500 in 1960
Oswald Rathmann (born 1891), German road racing cyclist who competed in the 1912 Summer Olympics
Peggy Rathmann (born 1953), American illustrator and writer of children's picture books

See also
Rahman (disambiguation)
Rathausmann
Ratman